The Battle of Carumbé (Portuguese: Batalha de Carumbé), (Spanish: Batalla de Carumbé) was a battle fought between an army of the United Kingdom of Portugal, Brazil and the Algarves and the forces of José Artigas. The battle resulted in a decisive Luso-Brazilian victory, as Artigas' plans to invade Brazil were permanently ruined.

References

Carumbe
Carumbe
Conflicts in 1816
1816 in Portugal
1816 in Brazil
1816 in Uruguay